Witalis Wieder was a leader of the Goralenvolk during World War II. As a Reichsdeutscher, he acted as a collaborator for the Nazi occupiers even though he had been an officer in the Polish army. At the end of the war, he escaped to Germany.

References

Polish Gorals
Possibly living people
Polish collaborators with Nazi Germany